The 1989 Autonomous Region in Muslim Mindanao creation plebiscite was a creation plebiscite held on November 17, 1989, in parts of Mindanao and Palawan in the Philippines.

Background
Upon the installation of President Corazon Aquino following the 1986 People Power Revolution which deposed Ferdinand Marcos, the Moro National Liberation Front (MNLF) held negotiations in with the Aquino administration in Jeddah. The MNLF pushed for the government for the outright establishment of an autonomous region in Mindanao as per the 1976 Tripoli Agreement through an executive order; a demand which the government did not accept.

The 1987 Constitution of the Philippines adopted during Aquino's presidency allows for the creation of an autonomous region in "Muslim Mindanao". Republic Act No. 6734 or the Organic Act which proposed for the creation of such region called the Autonomous Region in Muslim Mindanao (ARMM) was signed into law on August 1, 1989, by President Corazon Aquino but had to be ratified through a plebiscite which was held on November 17, 1989.

Both the MNLF, and its splinter group the Moro Islamic Liberation Front, boycotted the vote.

Only four provinces namely Lanao del Sur, Maguindanao, Sulu and Tawi-Tawi opted to be included in the newly formed ARMM. The Muslim-majority province of Basilan and the city of Marawi in Lanao del Sur notably voted against its inclusion to the ARMM. Elections for the first set of regional officials were held in February 1990.

The new autonomous region was inaugurated on November 6, 1990. The region would be expanded following a second plebiscite in 2001.

References

1989 in the Philippines
Regional plebiscites in the Philippines
1989 referendums
Presidency of Corazon Aquino
History of Bangsamoro
Autonomy referendums